Shorea sumatrana is a species of tree in the family Dipterocarpaceae. It grows naturally in Sumatra, Java and Peninsular Malaysia.

References

sumatrana
Trees of Sumatra
Trees of Java
Trees of Peninsular Malaysia
Taxonomy articles created by Polbot